Pentanodes albofasciatus is a species of beetle in the family Cerambycidae. It was described by Fisher in 1932.

References

Tillomorphini
Beetles described in 1932